Mohamad Mostafa Hammoud (born 1 May 1984) is a Lebanese footballer who plays as a right-back for  club Akhaa Ahli Aley.

Club career 
Starting his career at Sagesse in 2001, Hammoud remained at the Beirut-based club until 2009, when he moved to Akhaa Ahli Aley. After spending five years at the club, he joined Nejmeh in 2014, before moving to Shabab Arabi in 2017, staying one season.

Hammoud moved to Sporting on 12 October 2020; he became the team captain, and helped his team gain promotion to the Lebanese Premier League for the first time.

Hammoud returned to Akhaa Ahli Aley on 13 July 2022.

Honours 
Sagesse
 Lebanese FA Cup runner-up: 2006
 Lebanese Federation Cup runner-up: 2004

Nejmeh
 Lebanese FA Cup: 2015–16
 Lebanese Elite Cup: 2014, 2016, 2017
 Lebanese Super Cup: 2014, 2016

Sporting
 Lebanese Second Division: 2020–21

Akhaa Ahli Aley
 Lebanese Challenge Cup: 2022

References

External links 

 
 
 
 

1984 births
Living people
Footballers from Beirut
Lebanese footballers
Association football fullbacks
Sagesse SC footballers
Akhaa Ahli Aley FC players
Nejmeh SC players
Al Shabab Al Arabi Club Beirut players
AC Sporting players
Lebanese Premier League players
Lebanese Second Division players
Lebanon international footballers